Slovianoserbsk (or Slavianoserbsk) is an urban-type settlement in Alchevsk Raion of Luhansk Oblast in eastern Ukraine. It was the administrative center of Slovianoserbsk Raion before the district was abolished in 2020.

History 

The settlement was founded by Serbian settlers in 1753. From 1753 to 1764, Slovianoserbsk was the capital of Russian territory Slavo-Serbia as Podgornoie (or Pidhirne, ; 1754–84). In 1764 Slavo-Serbia was transformed into the Donets county and in 1784 the town was renamed into Donetskoie (or Donetske). In 1796, it lost its status of a county seat. In 1817 it became again a county seat, and both the town and county were renamed to Slavianoserbsk. In 1870, the town had a population of 3,156. It hosted three annual fairs in the late 19th century. Soon after the Ukrainian independence of 1918, Ukrainian form of Slovianoserbsk was adopted as well.

A local newspaper is published in the city since March 1939.

During World War II, in 1942–1943, the German occupiers operated a Nazi prison in the town.

Since 2014, Slovianoserbsk has been controlled by the separatist troops (so-called LNR) and their Russian supporters.

Demographics
According to the 2001 census in Ukraine, the town had 61.72% Russian speakers and 37.54% Ukrainian speakers.

People from Slovianoserbsk 
 Yuriy Klymenko (born 1973), Ukrainian politician

References

Urban-type settlements in Alchevsk Raion
Slovianoserbsk Raion
Populated places established in 1753
Slavo-Serbia
Slavyanoserbsky Uyezd